Heart Attack is the tenth studio album by the Swiss hard rock band Krokus, and is described by the band as "the last attempt to keep the band together in a deep crisis".
As well as being the band's first album on MCA Records, it saw the return of original Krokus founding member Chris von Rohr.

Heart Attack is the only Krokus album to feature drummer Dani Crivelli who played drums on von Rohr's 1987 solo album, Hammer & Tongue, and previously recorded and toured with Solothurn rivals Killer. In the early 1980s, Crivelli was a member of Detroit, a hard rock band that featured Krokus guitarist Fernando von Arb's then wife, Birthe von Arb, on lead vocals.

The track "Rock 'n' Roll Tonight" was a live hit and is still played by the band in concerts.

Track listing
All songs written by Krokus, except where indicated

Side one
 "Everybody Rocks" - 3:50
 "Wild Love" - 4:01
 "Let It Go" - 4:31
 "Winning Man" (Fernando von Arb, Chris von Rohr) - 5:15  (originally on Hardware)
 "Axx Attack" - 4:24

 Side two
"Rock 'n' Roll Tonight" - 3:58
 "Flyin' High" (Krokus, Jürg Naegeli) - 4:14
 "Shoot Down the Night" - 4:37
 "Bad, Bad Girl" - 5:58
 "Speed Up" - 6:24

Personnel
Krokus
Marc Storace – Vocals
Fernando von Arb – Lead and rhythm guitar, bass, piano
Mark Kohler – Rhythm and lead guitar, bass
Chris von Rohr – Bass, piano, percussion, drums
Dani Crivelli – Drums, percussion

Production
Jürg Naegeli – Engineer, mixing assistant
Michael Wagener – Mixing at The Enterprise, Los Angeles, California
Scott Blockland – Mixing assistant
Stephen Marcussen – Mastering
Chris Achilleos - Cover illustration
Richard Evans - Art direction and design

Charts

References

Krokus (band) albums
1988 albums
MCA Records albums